Birkin is a surname, and may refer to several people from the same family of Birkin baronets:

 Andrew Birkin actor, screenwriter, and director; brother of Jane
 Anno Birkin, musician; son of Andrew
 Archie Birkin, British racing driver; brother of Henry
 Charles Birkin, British horror story author; 5th Baronet
 David Tristan Birkin, British actor; son of Andrew
 Henry Birkin, British racing driver; 3rd Baronet
 Jane Birkin, British actress; great-granddaughter of 1st baronet
 Richard Birkin (1805-1870), British lace manufacturer
 Thomas Birkin (1831-1922), 1st Baronet, lace manufacturer, son of Richard Birkin

The surname is also shared by the following unrelated individuals:

 Michael Birkin (executive), English businessman
 Edith Birkin, artist and Holocaust survivor

Fictional characters
 Annette Birkin, fictional character from Resident Evil 2
 Rowley Birkin, fictional character from The Fast Show
 Rupert Birkin, fictional character from Women in Love
 Sherry Birkin, fictional character from Resident Evil 2 and Resident Evil 6
 William Birkin, fictional character from Resident Evil 2
 Shigeki Birkin (Badman) and Charlotte Birkin (Bad Girl) from the No More Heroes series

See also
 Birkin family (Russian nobility)
 Kurt Birkins, American baseball player
 Birkin (disambiguation)